This article is a list of notable think tanks sorted by country.

United Nations
United Nations University (UNU)

European Union
European Council on Foreign Relations
Leap2020
OneEurope

Albania
Albanian Institute for International Studies

Argentina
Balseiro Institute
Institute of Scientific and Technical Research for Defense
Leloir Institute
National Agricultural Technology Institute
National Atomic Energy Commission
National Institute of Industrial Technology
National Scientific and Technical Research Council

Australia

Australia Institute (TAI)
Australian Institute of International Affairs (AIIA)
Australian Strategic Policy Institute (ASPI)
Brisbane Institute
Centre for Independent Studies
Centre for Policy Development
Chifley Research Centre
Committee for Economic Development of Australia
Development Policy Centre
East Asian Bureau of Economic Research (EABER)
Evatt Foundation
Grattan Institute
H.R. Nicholls Society
Institute of Public Affairs (Australia) (IPA)
Lowy Institute for International Policy
Mannkal Economic Education Foundation
Menzies Research Centre
Per Capita
Prosper Australia
Strategic and Defence Studies Centre (SDSC)
Sydney Institute
The McKell Institute
United States Studies Centre
Western Australia Policy Forum

Azerbaijan
Center for Economic and Social Development (CESD)
Center for Strategic Studies under the President of Azerbaijan

Bangladesh
Bangladesh Institute of Development Studies (BIDS)
Bangladesh Institute of Law and International Affairs (BILIA)
Bangladesh Institute of Peace and Security Studies (BIPSS)
Centre for Policy Dialogue (CPD)
Making Our Economy Right (MOER)

Belgium

Bruegel
Centre for European Policy Studies
Centre for the New Europe
Egmont
European Centre on the International Political Economy
European Policy Centre
Friends of Europe
International Crisis Group
Itinera Institute
Liberales
Nova Civitas
Vlaamse Volksbeweging

Bosnia and Herzegovina

Foreign Policy Initiative BH

Brazil
Fundação Getúlio Vargas
Institute of Applied Economic Research

Canada

Asia Pacific Foundation of Canada
Atlantic Institute for Market Studies
Atlantic Provinces Economic Council
Broadbent Institute
C. D. Howe Institute
Caledon Institute of Social Policy
Canada West Foundation
Canadian Centre for Policy Alternatives
Canadian Global Affairs Institute
Canadian Institute for Advanced Research
Canadian International Council
Canadian Tax Foundation
Centre for International Governance Innovation
Conference Board of Canada
Council of Canadians
Fraser Institute
Frontier Centre for Public Policy
Institute for Liberal Studies
Institute for Research on Public Policy
International Institute for Sustainable Development
Justice Centre for Constitutional Freedoms
Macdonald-Laurier Institute
Montreal Economic Institute
Mowat Centre
North-South Institute
Pembina Institute
Public Policy Forum
Wellesley Institute

Chile
Centro de Estudios Públicos
Libertad y Desarrollo

China
China Center for International Economic Exchanges
China Development Institute
Chinese Academy of Social Sciences
Shanghai Academy of Social Sciences
State Information Center of China
Taihe Institute

Costa Rica
Facultad Latinoamericana de Ciencias Sociales

Czech Republic
CEVRO
Institute for Social and Economic Analyses

Denmark

CEPOS
Copenhagen Institute
Copenhagen Institute for Futures Studies

Egypt

Al-Ahram Center for Political and Strategic Studies

Finland

Åland Islands Peace Institute
Crisis Management Initiative
Demos Helsinki
European Centre of Excellence for Countering Hybrid Threats
Finnish Institute of International Affairs
Research Institute of the Finnish Economy

France

Centre d'Etudes Prospectives et d'Informations Internationales (CEPII)
Cercle de l'Oratoire
Conférence Olivaint
European Union Institute for Security Studies
Gracques
Groupement de recherche et d'études pour la civilisation européenne
Institut Choiseul for International Politics and Geoeconomics
Institut français des relations internationales (IFRI)
Institut Montaigne
Jacques Delors Institute
Mont Pelerin Society
Saint-Simon Foundation
Sport and Citizenship

Georgia
Georgian Foundation for Strategic and International Studies
New Economic School – Georgia

Germany

Atlantic Community
Bonn International Center for Conversion
Bundesakademie für Sicherheitspolitik
Centre for European Policy
Center for Monitoring, Analysis and Strategy (CeMAS)
Deutsche Gesellschaft für auswärtige Politik
Friedrich Ebert Foundation
Friedrich Naumann Foundation
German Advisory Council on Global Change (WBGU)
German Institute for Economic Research (DIW)
German Institute for International and Security Affairs
German Institute of Global and Area Studies
Hanns Seidel Foundation
Heinrich Böll Foundation
Ifo Institut für Wirtschaftsforschung (IFO)
Konrad Adenauer Foundation
Peace Research Institute Frankfurt
Rosa Luxemburg Foundation
Stiftung Neue Verantwortung (SNV)
Stiftung Wissenschaft und Politik (SWP)
Walter Eucken Institut

Greece
Centre of Planning and Economic Research (KEPE)
Hellenic Foundation for European and Foreign Policy (ELIAMEP)
International Centre for Black Sea Studies (ICBSS)

Hong Kong

 Bauhinia Foundation Research Centre
 Central Policy Unit – a government department
 Civic Exchange
 HKGolden50
 Hong Kong Democratic Foundation
 New Century Forum
 One Country Two Systems Research Institute
 Our Hong Kong Foundation
 Path of Democracy
 The Global Institute for Tomorrow
 The Lion Rock Institute
 The Professional Commons

Hungary
Centre for Fair Political Analysis
Club of Budapest
 Danube Institute
Millennium Institute

India

Association for Democratic Reforms (ADR) – New Delhi
Centre for Civil Society (CCS) – New Delhi
Centre for Policy Research (CPR) - New Delhi
Centre for Public Policy Research – Kochi, Kerala
Chennai Centre for China Studies (CCCS)
Foundation for Democratic Reforms (FDR) – Hyderabad, Telangana
Indian Institute of Corporate Affairs (IICA) - New Delhi
Institute for Defence Studies and Analyses (IDSA)
Nabakrushna Choudhury Centre for Development Studies (NCDS), Bhubaneswar
Observer Research Foundation (ORF) – New Delhi
Public Health Foundation of India (PHFI) – New Delhi
Strategic Foresight Group (SFG) – Mumbai
United Service Institution of India (USI-India) – New Delhi
Vivekananda International Foundation (VIF) – New Delhi

Indonesia

Centre for Strategic and International Studies (CSIS)

Ireland

Institute of International and European Affairs (IEA)
Iona Institute
TASC (Think-Tank for Action on Social Change)

Iran

Association for Iranian Studies
Foundation for Iranian Studies
Institute of Iran and Eurasia Studies (Iras)
Ravand Institute
Scandinavian Society for Iranian Studies

Israel

Begin-Sadat Center for Strategic Studies
Institute for Advanced Strategic and Political Studies
Institute for National Security Studies
Israel Council on Foreign Relations
Israel Democracy Institute
Jerusalem Center for Public Affairs
Jerusalem Institute for Policy Research
Reut Institute
Shaharit
Shalem Center
Van Leer Jerusalem Institute

Italy

Bruno Leoni Institute
Club of Rome
European University Institute
Future Italy
Institute for International Political Studies (ISPI)
Istituto Affari Internazionali
Trinità dei Monti

Japan

Asian Development Bank Institute
Genron NPO
Institute of Developing Economies (IDE-JETRO)
Japan Institute of International Affairs
National Institute for Research Advancement (NIRA)

Kazakhstan
Kazakhstan Institute for Strategic Studies (KISS)

Kenya
Kenya Institute for Public Policy Research and Analysis

Lebanon
Issam Fares Institute for Public Policy and International Affairs

Malaysia
Institute for Democracy and Economic Affairs (IDEAS)

Mexico
Center of Research for Development (CIDAC)
Instituto de Pensamiento Estratégico Ágora (IPEA)

Netherlands

Center for European Renewal
Edmund Burke Foundation
International Institute for Research and Education
Netherlands Institute for Multiparty Democracy
Netherlands Institute of International Relations Clingendael
The Hague Institute for Global Justice
Wiardi Beckman Foundation (PvdA)

New Zealand

Centre for Strategic Studies New Zealand
Helen Clark Foundation
Maxim Institute
McGuinness Institute
Motu Economic and Public Policy Research
New Zealand Initiative
New Zealand Institute (2004–2012)
New Zealand Institute of Economic Research

Nigeria

African Centre for Development and Strategic Studies (ACDESS)
National Institute of Policy and Strategic Studies (NIPSS)
Nigerian Economic Summit Group (NESG)
Nigerian Institute of International Affairs (NIIA)

Pakistan

Applied Economics Research Centre (AERC)
Centre for Aerospace and Security Studies (CASS)
Institute of Policy Studies (IPS)
Institute of Regional Studies(IRS)
Institute of Strategic Studies (ISS)
Islamabad Policy Research Institute (IPRI)
Pakistan Academy of Sciences
Pakistan Institute of Development Economics (PIDE)
Pakistan Institute of International Affairs (PIIA)
Research Society of International Law (RSIL)
Social Policy and Development Centre (SPDC)
Sustainable Development Policy Institute

Philippines
Center for Research and Communication (CRC)
Foreign Service Institute (FSI)

Poland

Adam Smith Centre
Centre for Eastern Studies (OSW)
Institute of Economics
Polish Institute of International Affairs
Sobieski Institute
The Casimir Pulaski Foundation (FKP)
The Kosciuszko Institute

Russia

 Agentura.Ru
 Analytical Center for the Government of the Russian Federation
 Carnegie Moscow Center (United States-based)
 Center for Strategic Research (Russia)
 Central Economic Mathematical Institute
 Centre for Analysis of Strategies and Technologies
 Civil Society Development Foundation
 Dialogue of Civilizations (DOC) (Berlin-based)
 Gorchakov Fund
 INSOR
 Institute for Election Systems Development
 Institute for US and Canadian Studies
 Institute of Democracy and Cooperation (IDC) (Paris-based)
 Institute of World Economy and International Relations
 Izborsky club
 Russian Institute for Strategic Studies (RISI)
 Russian International Affairs Council (RIAC)  
 SOVA Center
 Valdai Discussion Club

Saudi Arabia
King Abdullah Petroleum Studies and Research Center

Serbia
 Balkan Trust for Democracy
 Centre for Contemporary Politics
 European Fund for the Balkans
 Institute of International Politics and Economics
 Institute of Political Studies in Belgrade

Singapore

Institute of Policy Studies
Lee Kuan Yew School of Public Policy
Official Monetary and Financial Institutions Forum*Singapore Institute of International Affairs
S. Rajaratnam School of International Studies

Slovakia

Forum Minority Research Institute
Globsec
Institute for Public Affairs (IVO)

South Africa
Centre for Conflict Resolution
Centre for Development and Enterprise
Free Market Foundation
Institute for Security Studies

South Korea

Center for Free Enterprise (CFE)
Korea Development Institute (KDI)
Korea Institute for International Economic Policy (KIEP)
Korea Institute of Public Administration (KIPA)
Sejong Institute
The Asan Institute for Policy Studies (The Asan Institute)

Spain

Barcelona Centre for International Affairs (CIDOB)
Club of Madrid
Elcano Royal Institute
Foundation for Analysis and Social Studies (FAES)
FRIDE
Fundación Alternativas
IDEAS Foundation for progress
Real Academia de Ciencias Morales y Políticas
Royal Institute of European Studies (RIEE)

Sri Lanka
Lakshman Kadirgamar Institute of International Relations and Strategic Studies
LIRNEasia

Sweden

Captus
Eudoxa
Ratio Institute
Stockholm International Peace Research Institute
Timbro

Switzerland

Avenir Suisse
Center for Security Studies
foraus · Swiss Forum on Foreign Policy
Geneva Centre for Security Policy
Geneva Centre for the Democratic Control of Armed Forces
Geneva International Centre for Humanitarian Demining
Horasis
Liberales Institut
World Economic Forum

Taiwan

Chung-Hua Institution for Economic Research
Industrial Technology Research Institute
Institute for Information Industry
Institute for National Defense and Security Research
National Applied Research Laboratories
Prospect Foundation
Taiwan Asia Exchange Foundation
Taiwan Competitiveness Forum
Taiwan External Trade Development Council
Taiwan Foundation for Democracy
Taiwan Institute of Economic Research

Turkey

Global Political Trends Center (GPoT Center)
International Strategic Research Organization (USAK)
Turkish Economic and Social Studies Foundation (TESEV)

Ukraine

Centre of Policy and Legal Reform (CPLR) 
International Centre for Policy Studies (ICPS)
The Razumkov Centre

United Arab Emirates

Gulf Research Center

United Kingdom

United States

External links

References